Tilla may refer to:

People
Tilla Durieux (1880–1971), Austrian actor
Tilla Valstad (1871–1957), Norwegian teacher, novelist, and journalist
Tilla Weinstein (1934–2002), American mathematician

Places
Tilla Satellite Launch Centre in India
Tilla Jogian, temple complex in India

Other
Tilla (deity), bull-god in the Hittite pantheon